Ambrosius Francken II, also called the younger, to distinguish him from his uncle of the same name, was born at Antwerp in the latter part of the 16th century. He studied under his father, Frans Francken the elder, whose style he imitated. In 1624 he was registered as a master in the Guild of St. Luke at Antwerp, and he is said to have painted some time in Leuven. He died in 1632. Little else is known of him.

Family tree

References

 

Year of birth unknown
1632 deaths
17th-century Flemish painters
Painters from Antwerp
Ambrosius II